The 2022–23 Azadegan League is the 22nd season of the Azadegan League and 22nd as the second highest division since its establishment in 1991. The season will start on 11 October 2022 with 13 teams from the 2021–22 Azadegan League, two new teams relegated from the 2021–22 Persian Gulf Pro League: Shahr Khodro and Fajr Sepasi and three new teams promoted from the 2021–22 League 2: Chooka, Shahin Bandar Ameri and Van Pars Naghshe Jahan as champion, runner-up and third placed team respectively.
These changes has been applied before the season:

Teams

Stadia and locations

Number of teams by region

League table

See also
 2022–23 Persian Gulf Pro League
 2022–23 2nd Division
 2022–23 3rd Division
 2022–23 Hazfi Cup
 2022 Iranian Super Cup

References

Azadegan League seasons